Alasdair Middleton is a leading British opera librettist and playwright with librettos commissioned by the Royal Opera House, Opera North and the Berlin Philharmonic among others. He is responsible for a series of important operatic collaborations with the British composer Jonathan Dove including The Enchanted Pig and The Adventures of Pinocchio. He has also worked extensively with the choreographer Will Tuckett both as librettist and co-director, and has written several works with Matthew King including the award-winning community opera On London Fields. Middleton’s plays include Aeschylean Nasty, Shame on you Charlotte, Casta Diva and Einmal. He teaches the Junior Drama Classes at the Guildhall School of Music and Drama.

Opera libretti 
Everything Money Can Buy (The Opera Group)
Out Of The Ordinary (The Opera Group)
 The World Was All Before Them; composer, Matthew King
 Lessons from Harmony; composer, Matthew King
 On London Fields; composer, Matthew King (2005)
 The Hackney Chronicles; composer, Jonathan Dove
 Red Riding Hood; composer, Jonathan Dove
 On Spital Fields; composer, Jonathan Dove (2006)
 The Enchanted Pig; composer, Jonathan Dove (The Opera Group at the Young Vic, 2006) 
 The Adventures of Pinocchio; composer, Jonathan Dove (Opera North / Sadlers Wells, 2007)
The Feathered Friend; composer, Helen Chadwick (Riverside Studios)
A Bird in Your Ear; composer, David Bruce, Bard College, New York, March 2008   
Swanhunter; composer, Jonathan Dove (2009)
 Schoenberg in Hollywood; composer, Matthew King (2015)
 Il Pastorale, l'Urbano e il Suburbano; composer, Matthew King (2015)

Play 
 Einmal (Stoked Festival, 2007)

Published works 
 The Enchanted Pig (Oberon Modern Plays, 2008) ,

References

British dramatists and playwrights
Living people
British male dramatists and playwrights
Year of birth missing (living people)